"Living Together, Growing Together" is a song written by Burt Bacharach and Hal David for the 1973 film Lost Horizon, and originally performed by James Shigeta and the Shangri-La chorus in the film.

Fifth Dimension recording
"Living Together, Growing Together" had commercial success as a single performed by The 5th Dimension. The single, produced by Bones Howe and arranged by Bob Alcivar and Artie Butler, reached #5 on the U.S. adult contemporary chart, #9 on the Canadian adult contemporary chart, and #32 on the Billboard Hot 100 in 1973, marking the band's last Top 40 hit.  It was featured on their 1973 album, Living Together, Growing Together.

Other versions
Tony Bennett featuring The Mike Curb Congregation released a version of the song as a single in 1972 that reached #111 on the Billboard chart.
Ferrante & Teicher released a version of the song on their 1973 album, Killing Me Softly.

References

1972 songs
1972 singles
Songs with music by Burt Bacharach
Songs with lyrics by Hal David
The 5th Dimension songs
Tony Bennett songs
Song recordings produced by Bones Howe
Bell Records singles
Verve Records singles